Festus Baise  (born 11 April 1980) is a former Nigerian-born Hong Kong professional footballer who played as a centre back.

Club career

Early career
Festus Baise was born in Lagos, Nigeria and was advised to go to Hong Kong and have tryouts with top tier clubs Happy Valley and Sun Hei. He would receive an offer from second tier club Mutual where he started his football career in the 2004–05 league season. Baise would join top tier club South China half way through the season and played in six games, scoring one goal.

Citizen
On 16 December 2011, Baise scored an own goal, described as a reverse scorpion kick, past his goalkeeper Tse Tak Him in a 3–2 win over Sun Hei in the league match. It was selected as the 5th best own goal of all time by the Daily Telegraph's Steve Wilson.

On 21 March 2012, Baise struck a last-minute winner as Citizen edged out Myanmar's Yangon United 2–1 at Mongkok Stadium to record a first win of the 2012 AFC Cup campaign in Group G.

Guizhou Hengfeng
On 13 December 2015, Chinese club Guizhou Hengfeng signed Baise from Eastern, citing his performances against China in two matches during 2018 FIFA World Cup qualification. He arrived at the club on 1 January 2016.

On 1 March 2018, Guizhou announced that Baise had signed a new contract through the end of 2019. He left the club after his contract expired.

International career
Baise was born in Nigeria, and is of Ghanaian descent. In December 2012, Baise confirmed that he had applied to the Hong Kong Immigration Department for naturalisation as a Chinese citizen.
He was granted the Hong Kong SAR Passport on 7 March 2015 and Baise made his international debut for Hong Kong against Guam on 28 March 2015.

Career statistics

Club
.

International

International goals
Scores and results list Hong Kong's goal tally first.

Personal life
Born in Lagos, Nigeria, Baise is of Ghanaian descent. In December 2012, Baise confirmed that he had applied to the Hong Kong Immigration Department for naturalisation as a Chinese citizen. He was granted a Hong Kong SAR passport on 7 March 2015. His brother, Henry Baise Okwara (or 亨利, born Apr 16, 1992), is also a footballer. He is a Ghanaian citizen who came to Hong Kong with him and was granted a Hong Kong SAR passport. On 1 January 2012, he transferred from Wing Yee to Citizen in the Hong Kong First Division, and has been at the club ever since.

Honours

Club
Citizen
Hong Kong Senior Shield: 2010–11

Eastern
Hong Kong Premier League: 2015–16

References

External links

1980 births
Living people
Sportspeople from Lagos
Hong Kong footballers
Hong Kong international footballers
Hong Kong expatriate footballers
Nigerian footballers
Hong Kong people of Ghanaian descent
Hong Kong people of Nigerian descent
Nigerian people of Ghanaian descent
Nigerian emigrants to Hong Kong
Association football central defenders
South China AA players
Citizen AA players
Eastern Sports Club footballers
Guizhou F.C. players
Hong Kong First Division League players
Hong Kong Premier League players
China League One players
Chinese Super League players
Hong Kong expatriate sportspeople in China
Expatriate footballers in China
Naturalized footballers of Hong Kong
Hong Kong League XI representative players